is a town located in Kushiro Subprefecture, Hokkaido. As of July 31, 2021, it has a population of 8,922, and an area of 734.82 km2. Lake Akkeshi is a Ramsar Site.

History 
Edo period – Was a penal colony for the Matsumae-han.
1900 – 4 towns and 7 villages combine, forming the town of Akkeshi.
1917 – Inauguration of Akkeshi Railway Station.
1935 - Japanese composer Akira Ifukube received the first prize for his first orchestral work 'Japanese Rhapsody' in an international contest for young composers promoted by Alexander Tcherepnin . 
1955 – The south half of the former Ota Village merges with Akkeshi.

Sights
Shinryu, the northern part of the town is linked to Honcho, the southern part, by a bridge offering a scenic view of the lagoon which separates both parts. The length of the bridge is 456 m.

Kokutai-ji is a Buddhist temple in Honcho which was founded in 1802. It is one of the oldest and most important temples of Hokkaido. The temple is operated by Rinzai school, one of three sects of Zen in Japanese Buddhism. Missionary activities to convert the Ainu started here in 1804.

Traffic connections
Akkeshi is about 50 km east of Kushiro on the east coast of Hokkaido. The town is on Nemuro Sen railway line and can be reached by train from  Kushiro and Nemuro several times a day. The railway station is in Shinryu. The nearest airport is in Kushiro.

Mascot

He is a yōkai samurai from the sea. His chonmage is stylized like a sea urchin, his eyebrows resembles kelp, his nose is like the Japanese littleneck clam and his ears are like Sakhalin surf clams. His hakama is armored with scallops. The sode (spaulders) on his hakama resembled oysters. His weapon is the saury (when he wields it, it acts like a katana to give a powerful slap to his adversaries).

References

External links

Official Website 

 
Towns in Hokkaido
Populated places established in 1900
1900 establishments in Japan